In algebra, a Malcev-admissible algebra, introduced by ,  is a (possibly non-associative) algebra that becomes a Malcev algebra under the bracket [a, b] = ab − ba. Examples include alternative algebras, Malcev algebras and Lie-admissible algebras.

See also

Jordan-admissible algebra

References

 

Non-associative algebra